Lydia Okumura  (born 1948) is a Brazilian artist known for her geometric abstractions.

Biography
Okumura was born in 1948 in São Paulo. She studied at Fundação Armando Alvares Penteado, graduating in 1973. In the 1970s she was part of a São Paulo art collective, "Equipe3". Around that time she moved to New York City to attended the Pratt Graphics Center. She has exhibited extensively since the 1970s. Her work is included in the collections of the Akron Art Museum, the Hara Museum of Contemporary Art, and the Metropolitan Museum of Art.

Okumura's first solo exhibition in the United States was in 2016 at the University at Buffalo. In 2019 she had a solo show at the Galerie Thaddaeus Ropac in London.

References

Further reading
 Lydia Okumura: Situations, by Rachel Adams (editor), Sternberg Press 

1948 births
Living people
20th-century Brazilian women artists
21st-century Brazilian women artists
Brazilian contemporary artists
People from São Paulo